Ziyarat al-Nabi Shu'ayb is a Druze religious festival and pilgrimage celebrated every year between 25 and 28 April in Nabi Shu'ayb, the shrine that contains the purported tomb of prophet Shuayb. It is officially recognized as a public holiday in Israel.

Holiday

The Druze generally only celebrate one holiday, Eid al-Adha. The Druze community in Israel under the leadership of Sheikh Amin Tarif, however, has endowed this period with a special status, deeming the ziyara a festive day by law. Workers are allowed to take a break from work without infringing their workers' rights. Schools operating under the Druze education system are closed for the period, while Druze soldiers in the Israel Defense Forces are also given the period as a vacation. The whole community, not just religious Druze in Israel, celebrates this Ziyara.

Celebrations
The celebration starts on 25 April and concludes on 28 April, with many religious leaders from all the religions in Israel, and also political leaders (occasionally also the PM), coming to congratulate the Israeli Druze community during their festivities at the Maqam al-Nabi Shu'ayb. Religious leaders or sheikhs from Mount Carmel, the Galilee and the Golan Heights take the opportunity to discuss religious issues.

Visits of Druze from Syria, Lebanon and Jordan during Ziyaras
 Since 1968, Druze from the Golan Heights can freely visit the shrine and they are also involved in the feast.
 Other Syrian Druze outside the Golan never used to be involved at the celebrations.
 Lebanese Druze rarely visited the shrine, but in 1982 a group from Lebanon, during the Israeli occupation of the south, answered the call of Sheikh Amin Tarif to visit. 
 Following the Israel–Jordan peace treaty in 1994, Jordanian Druze are permitted to visit the shrine throughout the year, and their visits are not restricted to the festive period.

See also
 Israeli Druze
 Nabi Shu'ayb
 Amin Tarif
 Ziyara

References

Druze culture
Druze community in Israel
Druze festivals and holy days
Public holidays in Israel
Spring (season) events in Israel
April observances